Cherdyn is a town and the administrative center of Cherdynsky District in Perm Krai, Russia, located on the Kolva River. Population:

History

Local authorities advertise Cherdyn to tourists as the capital of the ancient Principality of Great Perm. This information is based on an 1835 study by the Swedish historian A.M. Strinnholm as well as the 1815 study by the Russian historian Nikolay Karamzin. Strinnholm mentioned that the last trip of Scandinavian Vikings to Bjarmia (aka the Great Perm) happened in 1222. Four well-equipped ships of Haakon IV of Norway burned Bjarmian towns to the ground.

After that, the fur trade between the Great Perm and Western Europe was possible only via the Novgorod Republic, which became the suzerain of all Northern Russia. After the centralization of Russian principalities by the Grand Dukes of Moscow, the princes of Perm, who already had Russian names, became their vassals as well as answering to Novgorod. Great Perm–Cherdyn supplied a great deal of silver paid as tribute of Moscow, which in turn paid the Golden Horde. Tension between Moscow and Novgorod led to a war of 1471, after which the defeated Novgorod Republic was annexed by the Grand Duchy of Moscow. The next year (1472) Cherdyn, Pokcha, and all other towns of Great Perm also became the prizes of conquest. It was burned by indigenous tribes in the beginning of the 16th century.

Cherdyn, as well as all of Perm, was still governed by the dynasty of local Great Perm princes until 1505. After that, the Grand Duke sent a governor from Moscow, and he chose Cherdyn as his residence. In 1535, Cherdyn was granted town rights. It was the starting point of an early river route to Siberia. Following the establishment of the Babinov Road—a more traveled overland route—the town quickly lost its significance.

Administrative and municipal status
Within the framework of administrative divisions, Cherdyn serves as the administrative center of Cherdynsky District, to which it is directly subordinated. As a municipal division, the town of Cherdyn is incorporated within Cherdynsky Municipal District as Cherdynskoye Urban Settlement.

Climate
Cherdyn has a subarctic climate (Köppen climate classification Dfc), with very cold winters and warm summers. Precipitation is moderate and is somewhat higher in summer and fall than at other times of the year.

Notable people
In 1934, during the times of Stalin, Cherdyn was the place to which poet Osip Mandelstam was sentenced to internal exile with his wife Nadezhda.

References

Notes

Sources

Further reading
Brumfield, William. Cherdyn: Architectural Heritage in Photographs, (Moscow: Tri Kvadrata, 2007)  (in English and in Russian)

External links
Official website of Cherdyn 
Cherdyn Business Directory 

Cities and towns in Perm Krai
Cherdynsky Uyezd